

Baines is a locality in the Northern Territory of Australia located in the territory's west adjoining the border with the state of Western Australia about  south of the territory capital of Darwin and about  south-west of the municipal seat in Katherine.

The locality is bounded by the Western Australian border to the west, the limits of Northern Territory waters to the north and in part to the east by the Victoria River.  It consists of the following land (from north to south):
Land described as NT Portion 5774 and the Legune pastoral lease
Land described as NT Portion 1584 and the Spirit Hills and Bullo River pastoral leases
The Keep River National Park and the Newry and Auvergne pastoral leases, and
The Rosewood and Waterloo pastoral leases and the Nagurungguru Aboriginal Lands Trust.

The locality's boundaries and name were gazetted on 4 April 2007.  Its name is derived from "the Baines River, a tributary of the Victoria River, which was named during A C Gregory's North Australian Expedition of 1855-56 after Thomas Baines, artist of the expedition."

The 2016 Australian census which was conducted in August 2016 reports that Baines had a population of 249 people of which 157 (63.1%) identified as being "Aboriginal and/or Torres Strait Islander people."

Baines is located within the federal division of Lingiari, the territory electoral division of Stuart and the local government area of the Victoria Daly Region.

References

Populated places in the Northern Territory
Victoria Daly Region